Emphreus ferruginosus is a species of beetle in the family Cerambycidae. It was described by White in 1858, originally under the genus Acmocera.

References

Stenobiini
Beetles described in 1858